Cavell is a hamlet in Reford Rural Municipality No. 379, Saskatchewan, Canada. It previously held the status of a village until January 1, 1943.

History
Prior to January 1, 1943, Cavell was incorporated as a village, and was restructured as a hamlet under the jurisdiction of the Rural municipality of Reford No. 379 on that date.

See also
St. Joseph's Colony, Saskatchewan
List of Hudson's Bay Company trading posts
List of communities in Saskatchewan
Hamlets of Saskatchewan

References

Former villages in Saskatchewan
Hudson's Bay Company trading posts
Reford No. 379, Saskatchewan
Unincorporated communities in Saskatchewan
Division No. 13, Saskatchewan